Alexander Nikolayevich Zaitsev (June 15, 1935 – October 31, 1971) was a leading Soviet chess grandmaster. He was born in Vladivostok, Russia.

Perhaps his finest achievement was a share of first place at the 1968 USSR Chess Championship in Alma Ata. He eventually took the silver medal after losing the play-off to co-winner Lev Polugaevsky.  The Chessmetrics website, which provides estimated ratings and rankings for players, places him as 21st in the world in 1969. 

Zaitsev had been born with a clubfoot. In 1971, he had an operation to correct the problem. Details are hard to come by, but Zaitsev died of complications from the surgery.

Legacy

His name is attached to the Zaitsev Gambit of the Grünfeld Defence (1.d4 Nf6 2.c4 g6 3.Nc3 d5 4.h4).

References

External links
 

1935 births
1971 deaths
Chess grandmasters
Russian chess players
Soviet chess players
20th-century chess players